Now That's What I Call Love or Now Love is a double-disc compilation album released in the United Kingdom on 30 January 2012.

Now Love features eleven songs which reached number one on the UK Singles Chart: "Only Girl (In the World)", "Fight For This Love", "When Love Takes Over", "Changed the Way You Kiss Me", "Glad You Came", "Never Leave You", "Meet Me Halfway", "Don't Hold Your Breath", "Smile", "The Promise" and "Greatest Day".

Track listing

Disc 1

Disc 2

Charts

References

External links
Official site
Now That's What I Call Love (Track list)

2012 compilation albums
Love 2012
Sony Music compilation albums
EMI Records compilation albums
Universal Music Group compilation albums
Warner Music Group compilation albums